T. minuta  may refer to:
 Tagetes minuta, the Mexican marigold, mint marigold, wild marigold or stinking Roger, a tall upright plant species native to the southern half of South America
 Triplophysa minuta, a ray-finned fish species

See also
 Minuta